The 2016 Florida Tech Panthers football team represented the Florida Institute of Technology (FIT) during the 2016 NCAA Division II football season. They were led by head coach Steve Englehart, who was in his fourth season at Florida Tech.  The Panthers play their home games at Florida Tech Panther Stadium, approximately one mile from the Florida Tech campus and are members of the Gulf South Conference.

Schedule
Florida Tech announced its 2016 football schedule on February 17, 2016. The schedule consists of 5 home and 6 away games in the regular season. The Panthers will host GSC foes Delta State, Mississippi College, North Alabama, and Valdosta State, and will travel to Shorter, West Alabama, West Florida, and West Georgia.

The Panthers hosted only one non-conference game against Fort Valley State of the Southern Intercollegiate Athletic Conference and travel to two against Newberry of the South Atlantic Conference and Presbyterian of the Big South Conference.

The game between Florida Tech and North Alabama was cancelled in advance of the arrival of Hurricane Matthew.

Game summaries

at Newberry

Mississippi College

at Shorter

at Presbyterian

at West Florida

Fort Valley State

at West Alabama

Valdosta State

at West Georgia

Delta State

North Greenville

Awards and milestones

Gulf South Conference honors

Ten players from Florida Tech were honored as All-GSC selections by the league's coaches, including a program-record six First Team members.

Gulf South Conference All-Conference First Team

Antwaun Haynes, RB/AP
Kenny Johnston, TE
Cory Sanicky, G
Adonis Davis, DL
Chris Stapleton, LB
Manny Abad, DB

Gulf South Conference All-Conference Second Team

Trevor Sand, RB
Wayne Saunders II, WR
Joe Laguna, T
Kevin Delgado, G

Gulf South Conference offensive player of the week
November 14: Antwuan Haynes

Gulf South Conference defensive player of the week
September 12: Adonis Davis 
September 26: Jo Jackson 
October 31: Tyler Rosenblatt 
November 7: Chris Stapleton

School records
Most rushing touchdowns in a season: 10, Antwuan Haynes and Trevor Sand
Most passing yards in a single game: 502, Mark Cato (October 22)
Most receiving yards in a single game: 185, Kenny Johnston (October 1)
Most interceptions in a single game: 2, Tyler Rosenblatt (October 29) and Jo Jackson (September 24th)
Most yards of total offense gained in a single game: 643 (October 22)
Fewest yards of total offense surrendered in a single game: 73 (September 17)

References

Florida Tech
Florida Tech Panthers football seasons
Florida Tech Panthers football